Arevut, known as Duzkend until 1935 and Barozh until 2006, is a village in the Arevut Municipality of the Aragatsotn Province of Armenia. The town is mostly populated by Yazidis.

References

Brady Kiesling (1999), Rediscovering Armenia, p. 14, available at archive.org. The village is named Barozh in this work.

Populated places in Aragatsotn Province
Yazidi populated places in Armenia